Dudarova may refer to:
Veronika Dudarova (1916–2009), Russian conductor
9737 Dudarova, main-belt asteroid named after Veronika Dudarova